The Ivory Jean Paul Gaultier dress of Marion Cotillard refers to the custom white and silver mermaid dress worn by Marion Cotillard at the 80th Academy Awards on 24 February 2008. It was designed by Jean Paul Gaultier and custom made for Cotillard. A golden version of the dress was presented on the catwalk at Jean Paul Gaultier's Spring/Summer 2008 Couture Show during Paris Fashion Week on January 23, 2008.

Vogue magazine said the dress "was covered in hundreds of mermaid-like scales". Numerous outlets, including Vogue, ABC News, The Hollywood Reporter, Marie Claire, Entertainment Tonight, The Daily Telegraph, and Glamour, cited the dress as one of the greatest Oscar gowns of all time.

See also
 List of individual dresses

References

2000s fashion
2008 in fashion
Outfits worn at the Academy Awards ceremonies
White dresses